TMS Ringsted  is a handball club from Ringsted, Denmark. Currently, TMS Ringsted competes in the men's Danish Men's Handball League, whereas the woman's team compete in the 1st Division The home arena of the club is Ringsted-Hallen.

History
The club was founded on December 15, 1997, when Vetterslev-Høm G.F and Ringsted IF merged their first teams to create the new club. TMS is an abbreviation for Team Midtsjælland (Team central Zealand), the area in which Ringsted is located. The club has been nicknamed the "Ring Stingers" by fans. The club gained their first promotion to the Danish Handball League in 2003 and are currently coached by Marc Uhd.

Current squad
Squad for the 2022-23 season

Goalkeeper
 1  Tobias Lantz-Pedersen
 33  Patrick Bols
Wingers
Left Wing
 7  Oliver Barslund
 83  Pelle Schilling
Right Wing
 81  Tobias Nielsen
 88  Mikkel Olsen
Pivots
 2  Joachim Møller
 6  Sebastian Thor (c)
 25  Anders Agger Pedersen

Back players
Left Back
 17  Oliver Wosniak
 44  Frederik Horn Jakobsen
 85  Oliver Tesgaard Nielsen
Center Back
 5  Mark Nikolajsen
 21  Andreas Cortés Juul
 79  Oliver Klarskov
Right Back
 8  Christian Wacher
 9  Valdemar Gravesen
 15  Christian Nim
 18  Martin Risom

Transfers
Transfers for the 2023-24 season

Joining
  Andreas Haagen (GK) (from  Nancy Handball)
  Emil La Cour Andersen (LW) (from  GOG Håndbold)
  Nicolai Colunga Lyksbo (CB) (from  BM Torrelavega)
  Hakan Sahin (P) (from  Nordsjælland Håndbold)

Leaving
  Patrick Bols (GK) (to  HK Aranäs)
  Oliver Klarskov (CB) (to  Nordsjælland Håndbold)
  Martin Risom (RB) (to  KIF Kolding)
  Sebastian Thor (P)

Women's team

Staff

Current squad
Squad for the 2022-23 season

Goalkeeper
 12  Julie Munkø
 16  Josephine Togsverd
 20  Sofie Amalie Andersen
Wingers
LW
 2  Sylvie Gamys
 16  Amalie Bjaldby
 35  Emilie West
RW
 6  Rikke Vorgaard
 14  Nikoline Vendelborg
Pivots
 10  Kathrine Thomsen
 15  Frida Svingholm
 27  Frederikke Eibye

Back players
LB
 6  Laura Bjaldby
 11  Anne Cathrine Lundbye
 39  Kamilla Kristiansen
 44  Louise Hansen
CB
 5  Natascha Wollesen
 22  Siw Matras

RB
 37  Rebekka Kurland

Transfers
Transfers for the season 2022-23

Joining
  Sofie Amalie Andersen (GK) (from  Gudme HK)
  Siw Matras (LB) (from  Gudme HK)
  Rikke Vorgaard (RW) (from  Ajax København)

Leaving
  Christina Gregersen (GK) (retires)
  Rie Haslund (LW) (retires)
  Sofie Baastrup Andersen (LB) (retires)
  Louise Wendelbo (P) (retires)

References

External links
 TMS Ringsted

Danish handball clubs
Ringsted Municipality
Handball clubs established in 1997
1997 establishments in Denmark